Henry Conyngham, 1st Earl Conyngham PC (1705 – 3 April 1781) was an Anglo-Irish nobleman and politician.

He was the second son of General Henry Conyngham of Slane Castle and his wife Mary Williams, daughter of Sir John Williams, 2nd Baronet, and widow of Charles Petty, 1st Baron Shelburne. He succeeded to the family estate on the death of his brother William.

An absentee landlord, he owned extensive properties in counties Meath and Donegal, while spending most of his time abroad. Despite being a British MP, he also controlled the pocket Irish constituency of Newtown Limavady and sat for Killybegs between 1727 and 1753.

In 1765 he was made a Privy Councillor of Ireland.

He married Ellen Merrett, daughter of Solomon Merrett and Rebecca Savage but had no children. On his death all his titles became extinct except Baron Conyngham, which passed by special remainder to his nephew Francis Burton, who adopted the surname Conyngham.

References 

Secondary sources

|-

|-

|-

1705 births
1781 deaths
British MPs 1747–1754
British MPs 1754–1761
British MPs 1761–1768
British MPs 1768–1774
Earls in the Peerage of Ireland
Irish MPs 1727–1760
Members of the Parliament of Great Britain for English constituencies
Members of the Parliament of Ireland (pre-1801) for County Donegal constituencies
Members of the Privy Council of Ireland
Henry
Peers of Ireland created by George II